Charles Howard Johnson (December, 1865 – July 3, 1896) was an American illustrator and newspaper artist, best known for his sparse illustrations of the 1890 U.S. edition of The Princess by the English poet Alfred Lord Tennyson and illustrating many periodicals during the latter part of the 1890's.

Early life and education 
Little is known of Johnson's life. He has born in Vincennes, Indiana in 1865, and came to New York City in about 1889 after studying art for a year in Cincinnati, Ohio.

Career 
He worked for a number of magazines including Life, Truth, Munsey's Magazine, and on some of the daily newspapers. He illustrated more than ten books.

He was particularly effective in decorative work, often making the pictures fantastical.  Though his skill as an artist was widely recognized during his lifetime.

The work "A Young Girl Dancing" (1893, Pen and Ink) captures his whimsical skill.

Personal life 

He was engaged to be married to the actress Elita Proctor Otis, before he died at his apartment in the Union Square Hotel of brain fever on July 3, 1896, after an illness of ten days. His wife (one "Miss Gallagher") had died two years earlier, with whom he had a daughter named Gladys born 1887-1891.

References

 
 
 Johnson's Death Certificate
 Illustrations from Tiddleywink Tales

External links
 
 
 Charles Howard Johnson at AskArt.com
 The Lady of Shalott by Charles Howard Johnson at The Victorian Web (victorianweb.org)
 
 

1868 births
1896 deaths
American illustrators